Dance of Time may refer to:

Dance of Time (Clodion), a 1788 sculpture by Claude Michel
Dance of Time (album), a 2017 album by Eliane Elias
Adiemus III: Dances of Time, a 1998 album by Karl Jenkins
The Dance of Time, a 1936 Italian film
Dance of Time, a 2009 documentary film by Song Il-gon
Dance of Time (Ples vremena), a 2007 poetry collection by Dejan Stojanović
The Dance of Time, a 2006 novel in the Belisarius series